2013 IWRF European Championship was the 9th international European wheelchair rugby competition, taken place between 10 August - 17 August. The championships was contested between Europe's twelve top national teams and was held at the Pajulahti Sports Institute in Antwerp, Belgium. The tournament was won by Sweden, their fourth title.

The finalists of the competition, Denmark and Sweden, won the two European qualification slots for the wheelchair rugby tournament at the 2014 IWRF World Championships.

Tournament
Twelve teams contested the 2013 IWRF European Championship. The preliminary rounds consisted of a group stage where the teams were split into two leagues which were contested as a round-robin. The winner of group A then faced the second placed team from Group B and the winner of group B faced the second placed team from group A in elimination matches to determine the two finalists. The eventual winners, Great Britain, finished the competition unbeaten.

Preliminary round

Group A

Day 1

Day 2

Group B

Day 2

Day 3

Classification
Bracket

Medal round
Bracket

References

2013–14 in Belgian rugby union
2013–14 in European rugby union
International rugby union competitions hosted by Belgium
2013
2013 in wheelchair rugby